HNLMS  Van Kinsbergen, or MOV  Van Kinsbergen is a naval training ship of the Royal Netherlands Navy.

History 
The Van Kinsbergen was designed as a replacement for the ageing . The Zeefakkel was notorius for making people seasick and the new ship was supposed to prevent this from happening. But because the ship is to short, supposedly due to budget cuts, she has very poor sailing characteristics in heavy seas. Van Kinsbergen is therefor mokingly nicknamed the Van Kotsbergen,.

She is the first purposly built training vessel for the Dutch Navy and therefor is designed with two bridges, one for the navigation and one for training purposes.

Van Kinsbergen sails around 200 days in a year, mostly in the Baltic Sea to train students from the Royal Naval College.

On December 2009 she was asked by Danish authorities the help search for a sailboat in trouble on the Little Belt between Funen and the Jutland Peninsula. She took on the three sailers and the sailboat was towed with the RHIB.

In July 2010 Van Kinsbergen successfully recovered a large model aircraft from the English Channel which had caused some commotion on the busy sea lane.

Replacement 
 See Auxiliary ship replacement program for more information.
On 16 June 2022 it was announced in the B-letter that these ten vessels will be replaced by eight new ships of the same family. Four will be ocean going and the other four are for coastal or inland duties. Van Kinsbergen is to be replaced by the ocean going variant. These ships will be built by a Dutch shipyard which will be selected in 2024.

See also 
 Future of the Royal Netherlands Navy

References 

Training ships of the Royal Netherlands Navy